The Eparchy of Srem ( or ) is an eparchy (diocese) of the Serbian Orthodox Church in the Syrmia (Srem) region, Serbia. Most of the eparchy is in the autonomous province of Vojvodina, and it also includes a small south-eastern part of Syrmia within the city limits of Belgrade, as well as some West Syrmian parishes in the border region of Croatia. The seat of the eparchy is at Sremski Karlovci. Since 1986, the diocesan bishop is Vasilije Vadić.

History

The Eparchy of Srem is one of the oldest ecclesiastical institutions in this part of Southeastern Europe. The Bishopric of Sirmium was an important ecclesiastical center of the late Roman Empire in the 4th and 5th centuries. The bishopric collapsed after 582 when ancient Sirmium was finally destroyed by Avars. 

After the Christianization of the Slavs, the eparchy was revived, and from 1018 it belonged to the Eastern Orthodox Archbishopric of Ohrid. During the late Middle Ages, the region of Srem came under the jurisdiction of the Serbian Metropolitans of Belgrade. The most notable of these was St Maksim Branković, metropolitan of Belgrade and Srem (died 1516) who built the Monastery of Krušedol. During the 16th and 17th centuries they styled themselves as Metropolitans of Belgrade and Srem. In 1708, when the autonomous Serbian Metropolitanate was created within the Habsburg monarchy, the Eparchy of Srem became the archdiocese of the Metropolitan, whose seat was in Sremski Karlovci. The Eparchy remained part of the Metropolitanate of Karlovci until the end of the First World War. 

In 1920, when all the Serbian ecclesiastical provinces united into one Serbian Orthodox Church, the Eparchy of Srem, with its seat at Sremski Karlovci, came under the administration of Archbishop of Belgrade, who was also the Serbian Patriarch. Final unification of two eparchies was completed in 1931 when the Eparchy of Srem and the Archbishopric of Belgrade were united as the Archbishopric of Belgrade and Karlovci. During that period, the diocesan administration was delegated to titular bishops as archdiocesan vicars. 

In 1947, the region of Srem was excluded from the Archbishopric of Belgrade and Karlovci, and re-established as the separate Eparchy of Srem. Although the name of the Archbishopric of Belgrade and Karlovci still includes the name of the town of Sremski Karlovci, that town is today part of the Eparchy of Srem and not of the Archbishopric of Belgrade and Karlovci.

Seminary

The eparchy also possesses an Orthodox seminary at Sremski Karlovci. The seminary was founded in 1794. It is the second-oldest Orthodox seminary in the world (after the Spiritual Academy in Kyiv), and it operates to this day.

Monasteries belonging to the eparchy

Bishops 
Titular bishops - diocesan vicars:
 Maksimilijan Hajdin (1920—1928), 
 Irinej Đorđević (1928—1931), 
 Tihon Radovanović (1921—1934),
 Sava Trlajić (1934—1938),
 Valerijan Pribićević (1940—1941),
Bishops of Srem
 Vikentije Prodanov (1947—1951) (administrator)
 Nikanor Iličić (1951—1955)
 Makarije Đorđević (1955—1978)
 Andrej Frušić (1980—1986)
 Vasilije Vadić (since 1986)

See also
Serbian Orthodox Church
List of the Eparchies of the Serbian Orthodox Church
Religion in Serbia
Religion in Vojvodina

Gallery

Monasteries of Fruška Gora

Churches

References

Sources

External links
Official website
Eparchy of Srem

Srem
Srem
Srem
Syrmia